Voksa is an island in Sande Municipality in Møre og Romsdal county, Norway.

There are a few residents of the island, scattered about several farms on the island. The residents of Sandsøya must drive to Voksa to reach the only regular ferry connection to the islands. The ferry runs between the islands of Kvamsøya, Voksa, and Gurskøya and also to Åram on the mainland.

See also
List of islands of Norway

References

Islands of Møre og Romsdal
Sande, Møre og Romsdal